Fatal Vision is the 1983 true crime book by Joe McGinniss which lies at the center of the Fatal Vision controversy.

Fatal Vision also may refer to:
 Fatal Vision (miniseries), a 1984 TV miniseries adaptation of McGinniss' book
 Fatal Vision (goggles)

See also 
 Fatal Visions
 Jeffrey R. MacDonald, defendant in Fatal Vision murder case